Emil Backenius (16 January 1884 – 6 November 1968) was a Finnish wrestler. He competed in the heavyweight event at the 1912 Summer Olympics.

References

External links
 

1884 births
1968 deaths
People from Pukkila
Olympic wrestlers of Finland
Wrestlers at the 1912 Summer Olympics
Finnish male sport wrestlers
Sportspeople from Uusimaa